Jera may refer to:

 The j-rune, or Jeran
 Jera (butterfly), a genus of skipper butterflies
 Jera, Allahabad, a village in Uttar Pradesh, India
 Jera, Unnao, a village in Uttar Pradesh, India
 Jera, Iran, a village in Hamadan Province, Iran
JERA, Japanese electrical power generation company